The 2022–23 Texas Tech Red Raiders basketball team represented Texas Tech University in the 2022–23 NCAA Division I men's basketball season as a member of the Big 12 Conference. The Red Raiders were led by second-year coach Mark Adams. They played their home games at the United Supermarkets Arena in Lubbock, Texas. The day after the Red Raiders' final regular season game against Oklahoma State, Adams was suspended for what the school called an "inappropriate, unacceptable, and racially insensitive comment" that he had made the previous week. Adams would resign on March 8, following Tech's loss in the Big 12 tournament.

Previous season
The Red Raiders finished the 2021–22 season 27–10, 12–6 in Big 12 play to finish in third place. In the Big 12 tournament, they defeated Iowa State and Oklahoma to advance to the championship game where they lost to Kansas. They received an at-large bid to the NCAA tournament as the No. 3 seed in the West region. There they defeated Montana State and Notre Dame to advance to the Sweet Sixteen. In the Sweet Sixteen, they lost to Duke.

Offseason

Recruiting classes

2022 recruiting class

Roster

Schedule and results

|-
!colspan=12 style=|Regular season

|-
!colspan=9 style=|Big 12 tournament

Source
Source

Rankings

*AP does not release post-NCAA tournament rankings.

References

Texas Tech Red Raiders basketball seasons
Texas Tech
Texas Tech
Texas Tech